Henan Phoenix is a Chinese professional women's basketball club based in Henan, playing in the Women's Chinese Basketball Association (WCBA). Before 2014 it was known as Henan Elephants. The team is sometimes known by the name of its sponsor Yichuan Rural Commercial Bank (a bank based in Yichuan County, Henan).

Season-by-season records

Current players

Notable former players

 Jenny Mowe (2002–03)
 Tausha Mills (2004–05)
 Yolanda Griffith (2008–09)
 Katie Mattera (2009–11)
 Gabrielle Rosigi
 Dominic Seals (2011–12)
 Jayne Appel (2012–13)
 Tianna Hawkins (2014–15)
 Cheyenne Parker (2015–16)
 Chiney Ogwumike (2016–17)
 Huang Ping-jen (2015–17)
 Ji Yanyan (2008–10)
 Chen Xiaoli (2014–17)

References

Women's Chinese Basketball Association teams